Luqman Hakim Shamsudin (born 5 March 2002) is a Malaysian professional footballer who plays as a striker for Icelandic club Njarðvík, on loan from Belgian club Kortrijk and the Malaysia national team. He was included in The Guardian's "Next Generation 2019".

Early career
Luqman Hakim was first discovered by National Football Development Programme of Malaysia (NFDP) before starting his career at Mokhtar Dahari Academy. He was named in Goal Malaysia's NxGn 2020 list as one of the country's biggest talents.

Club career

Selangor FC II
Luqman as a youngster, who helped Malaysia reach the 2019 AFF U-18 Youth Championship final, was due to ink a five-year deal with his new team when he turned 18 in March 2020. However, his move fell through due to the COVID-19 pandemic and he ended up joining Malaysian club Selangor FC II instead. Luqman stressed that he remained keen on a move to Europe, though, when the time was right.

He eventually got his move to Kortrijk in July 2020, with Selangor announcing the move through an official statement.

KV Kortrijk
On 20 September 2019, it was confirmed that Luqman had signed a five-year deal with Belgian First Division side Kortrijk, a club owned by Malaysian businessman Vincent Tan. 

He is the first Malaysian player to be allowed to sign a professional contract before the age of 18. Luqman was supposed to be able to join the club in March 2020, but this was postponed due to the COVID-19 pandemic. He was finally introduced by the club to the press on 6 August 2020 through a video on the club's Facebook page. 

On 4 September 2020, Luqman made his debut for the first-team during a friendly match against BX Brussels, in which he scored the second goal. KV Kortrijk won the match 2-1. On 24 October 2020, Luqman was selected for the first team against Anderlecht and he made his league debut after coming on as a substitute in the 74th minute, with the match ending with a 1–3 loss for Kortrijk.

In October 2022, according to a source close to the player, Luqman Hakim Shamsudin is showing improvement after two seasons in Europe, and is slowly gaining the trust of his coach in the under-21 squad of KV Kortrijk. The coach of the main squad wanted to play him in a league match against Antwerp, but he was unfortunately injured. Luqman is said to be focused on the under-21 squad and is working hard to get a place in the main squad. The source added there is no truth to the rumor that he will be returning to Malaysia in the near future. Early February 2023, Icelandic second level football club Njarðvík reported that Luqman would spend the full year 2023 on loan to them.

International career

Youth
Luqman has represented Malaysia at all youth level from the under 16-side to the under-23 sides. He was part of the national team for the 2018 AFC U-16 Championship that took place in Kuala Lumpur, Malaysia. On 20 September 2018, he made an emphatic start to the AFC U-16 Championship with a 6–2 win over Tajikistan. In that match, he scored four goals. Luqman also assisted Najmuddin Akmal goal in the opening group-stage match. He played every minute of Malaysia's campaign at the tournament, which saw them eliminated at the group stage.

He later moved up to the under 19s squad for 2019 AFF U-19 Youth Championship in the Vietnam. Luqman played a large role in the Malaysia under-19s progression to the semi-finals. He scored 4 goals in 5 appearances during the matches. He played in the final against Australia which Malaysia lost 1–0.

On 2 November 2019, Luqman was named in the 20-man Malaysia Squad for the 2019 Sea Games.

Senior
In May 2021, Luqman was called up to the Malaysian national team for the friendly match against Bahrain and the 2022 FIFA World Cup qualification matches against the United Arab Emirates, Vietnam and Thailand. He debuted on 28 May 2021 in a 2–0 defeat against Bahrain.

Career statistics

Club

International

Honours
Malaysia U19
 AFF U-19 Youth Championship runner-up: 2019

Individual
 AFC U-16 Championship top goalscorer: 2018

References

2002 births
Living people
People from Kelantan
Malaysian people of Malay descent
Malaysian footballers
Malaysia youth international footballers
Malaysia international footballers
Malaysian expatriate sportspeople in Belgium
Expatriate footballers in Belgium
Malaysian expatriate sportspeople in Iceland
Expatriate footballers in Iceland
Belgian Pro League players
1. deild karla players
K.V. Kortrijk players
Njarðvík FC players
Association football forwards
Competitors at the 2019 Southeast Asian Games
Competitors at the 2021 Southeast Asian Games
Southeast Asian Games competitors for Malaysia